Rookwood Cemetery (officially named Rookwood Necropolis) is a heritage-listed cemetery in Rookwood, Sydney, New South Wales, Australia. It is the largest necropolis in the Southern Hemisphere and is the world's largest remaining operating cemetery from the Victorian era. It was added to the New South Wales State Heritage Register on 2 April 1999.

Description
Rookwood Cemetery is divided into denominational and operational areas with individual offices, staff, and equipment to run different parts of the entire area. The cemetery is now managed by three trusts. Rookwood Necropolis Land Manager are the custodians of Rookwood on behalf of the NSW Government. The two denominational trusts are responsible for the care and maintenance of a number of burial sections catering to various ethnic and cultural groups within the community. Those trusts are: Rookwood General Cemeteries Reserve Land Manager (Rookwood General Cemetery) and the Catholic Cemeteries and Crematoria. The NSW Cremation Company, which founded and operates The Rookwood Memorial Gardens Crematorium, is the oldest operating crematorium in Australia. The NSW Cremation Company is the only private company operating a 'cemetery' section within the Necropolis grounds. Today the company is part of the InvoCare company.

Rookwood also contains a number of memorial shrines including those dedicated to victims of The Holocaust and to members of the merchant marines killed in wartime. The Sydney War Cemetery is located in the eastern section of the Necropolis. The Circle of Love is a shrine dedicated to stillborn children or those who died in young infancy.

The "Friends of Rookwood Inc" is a voluntary organisation dedicated to preserving the site. As the largest Victorian era cemetery still in operation in the world, Rookwood is of significant national and historical importance.

Some older sections of Rookwood are overgrown with a riot of plants, early horticultural plants, some now large trees or groves, as well as an interesting array of remnant indigenous flora. This results in quite an eclectic mix of flora to be found within the necropolis, including endangered native species such as Downy wattle and small leaved Dillwynia (Dillwynia parvifolia).

History
In 1819, Governor Lachlan Macquarie established Sydney's main burial ground near the town's brickworks. By the 1840s, the Devonshire Street Cemetery was close to being full so another larger site was needed. A location on the Sydney Common was chosen in 1845, but abandoned in 1859 without ever being used due to complaints from local residents and churches. In Australia, as in Europe, there was an increasing trend to move burial sites outside of the cities for practical, hygienic and other more aesthetic purposes. With a railway line having been completed to Parramatta in 1856, it was decided to locate the new cemetery at a point on the line. Several sites were surveyed and found to be inappropriate. However, in 1862 the government purchased 80 hectares of land at Haslem's Creek from the estate of Edward Cohen. Cohen's land had previously formed part of a larger parcel known as "Hyde Park" that had been given to the magistrate and parliamentarian Henry Grattan Douglass in 1833 and subsequently leased out. The site was approved due to its relative isolation and proximity to the railway line.

The cemetery was then divided into sections for the various denominations according to their numbers in the 1861 census. The Church of England section was 21 hectares, the Catholic Church was allocated 14 hectares and a non-denominational area of 23 hectares was also established. Other denominations allocated land in the original 200 acres (80 hectares) were Jews, Independents (Congregationalists), Presbyterians and Wesleyans. The Necropolis Act of 1867 came into force on 1 January 1868 formally dedicating the cemetery and establishing cemetery trusts. The first burial in the cemetery, reported by the Sydney Morning Herald, was a pauper, 18-year-old John Whalan, buried on 5 January 1867. This burial was not recorded in the burial register. The first official burial was recorded in the Roman Catholic area: a 14-month-old toddler, Catherine McMullen, on 7 January 1867.

By 1879, more land was needed and the remaining 233 hectares of the former "Hyde Park" were then purchased. By the 1890s the cemetery was home to several buildings including the St Michael the Archangel Chapel and various cottages for section managers and sextons.

Originally known simply as the Necropolis (Koine Greek meaning "city of the dead"), local residents lobbied officials to have the name of their village changed from Haslem's Creek due to its association with the cemetery. In 1879, the villagers got their wish and the area's name was changed to Rookwood; however, before long, the Necropolis was also being referred to by that name. The settlement of Rookwood changed its name in 1913 to Lidcombe, as a blend of two mayors' names, Lidbury and Larcombe (Larcombe was also a monumental stonemason whose business exists to this day). The cemetery retained the name Rookwood.

The name Rookwood is most likely an accidental or deliberate corruption of the name Brookwood Cemetery and its associated railway station. At the time of Rookwood's opening, Brookwood Cemetery, located in Brookwood, Surrey, England, was one of the largest cemeteries in the world. It is less likely that, as claimed by some sources, Rookwood was named after William Harrison Ainsworth's novel Rookwood, written in 1834.

Railway line

Rookwood was served by a rail spur from the main line from 1867 until 1948. Mortuary stations served each of the three sections of the necropolis, with a fourth at the main junction and a fifth on Regent Street adjacent to Central station. The railway line construction began in November 1864 and from 1 January 1865, trains began their run into the cemetery.  It stopped at prearranged stations on the journey from central Sydney in order to pick up mourners and coffins.  Trains ran at 9.30am and 3pm. The trains that carried the mourners were known as 'unimproved Redferns' There were two types of Hearse carriages used for the procession. One consisted of a four-wheeled van that carried up to 10 coffins on its upper and lower shelves. Each of these shelves was designed so it could open onto the platform. There were also eight-wheeled vans that could hold 30 coffins. Both of these vehicles were attached the back of the train for transporting to the cemetery. At the terminus inside the cemetery the coffins were unloaded using 'wheeled hand-propelled litters' The rail line was used to convey funeral parties to Rookwood until 1948 when the expanded use of processions by road made it obsolete. The stations were offered to the Joint Committee of Necropolis Trustees for the price of £1 but due to maintenance costs the offer was rejected and the platforms within the cemetery were demolished. Cemetery Station No. 1 at the head of the rail spur was sold to Reverend Buckle for £100 in 1951 and was moved to Canberra in 1957 to become the All Saints Church, Canberra.

Cultural references
Rookwood Cemetery gave rise to the phrase "crook as Rookwood", meaning chronically ill, as "crook" is Australian slang for being unwell. A novel by Chris Nyst published in 2005 uses the phrase as its title.

Notable interments

 Three Victoria Cross recipients:
Sergeant John Paton, awarded in Indian Mutiny
Captain Richard Been Stannard, Royal Naval Reserve, awarded in Norway campaign, World War II (cremated)
Sergeant John Woods Whittle, awarded in World War I.
 Eric Bailey (1906–1945), recipient of the George Cross
 Barcroft Boake (1866–1892), poet
 James Barnet (1827–1904), NSW Government Architect
 Aaron Buzacott (1800–1864), Congregational minister, missionary at Rarotonga and founder of Takamoa Theological College; reinterred from Devonshire Street Cemetery
 Joseph Cahill (1891–1959), Premier of New South Wales
 The Clarke brothers, Thomas (1840–1867) and John (1846–1867), bushrangers
 Francis Lyon Cohen (1862–1934), the first Jewish chaplain in the British Army
 Peter Dawson (1882–1961), bass-baritone singer
 Peter Dodds McCormick (1834?–1916), songwriter ("Advance Australia Fair")
 John Fairfax (1804–1877), newspaper proprietor
 Eugene Falleni (1875–1938), murderer
 Lilian Fowler (1886–1954), Australia's first female mayor
 John Frazer (1827–1884), politician and businessman
 Albert Henry Fullwood (1863–1930), painter
 Jimmy Governor (1875–1901), outlaw
 John Gowing (1835–1908), co-founder of Gowings store
 John 'Barney' Hines (1878–1958), veteran WWI soldier, known for prowess as 'souvenir' collector from Germans
 Livingston Hopkins (1846–1947), illustrator & cartoonist, professionally known as 'Hop'
 Charles Hoskins (1851–1926), industrialist associated with the iron and steel industry
 Sallie-Anne Huckstep (1954–1986), Sydney underworld figure
 David Jones (1793–1873), founder of David Jones stores
 Samuel Joseph (1824–1898), merchant, politician, Jewish community leader
 Peter Kenna (1930–1987), playwright
 Jack Lang (1876–1975), Premier of New South Wales
 Louisa Lawson (1848–1920), suffragist
 Fred Maynard (1897–1946), Indigenous leader
 Mei Quong Tart (1850–1903), Sydney merchant and restaurateur
 George McRae (1858–1923), architect
 Bea Miles (1902–1973), well-known Sydney eccentric
 Bob Nichols (1809–1857), politician, first Auditor-General of NSW
 Jacob Pitman (1810–1890), advocate of shorthand (whose epitaph is written phonetically)
 Roy Rene (1891–1954), comedian
 Abe Saffron (1919–2006), businessman and underworld figure
 John 'Chow' Hayes (1911–1993), Underworld Figure
 Rose Scott (1847–1925), feminist
 Achille Simonetti (1838–1890), sculptor
 Kenneth Slessor (1901–1971), poet
 James Toohey (1850—1895), brewer
 Yip Ho Nung (1909–1979), restaurateur and Chinese community leader
 Mary Healy (Mother Gertrude) (1865–1952), Sister of Charity and hospital administrator

War graves
As at May 2020, Rookwood Necropolis contains the graves of a total 704 Commonwealth service personnel that are registered by the Commonwealth War Graves Commission, 435 from World War I and 274 from World War II, besides three Dutch war graves.
The commission also erected a memorial to 132 Commonwealth service personnel of World War II who were cremated at Rookwood Crematorium and whose ashes remain here.

Four Japanese Imperial Navy crewmen of midget submarines M-14 and M-21 who died in the World War II Attack on Sydney Harbour during 31 May–8 June 1942 were cremated with naval honours at Rookwood Cemetery. The ashes were returned to Japan later that year.

Sydney War Cemetery
Within the grounds of Rookwood Cemetery is enclosed the CWGC's Sydney War Cemetery, whose entrance is on the west side on the necropolis railway. It was established in 1942 during World War II for service personnel and there are now 732 buried or commemorated by name here. Most of those buried here died at the Concord Military Hospital in Sydney. The British war graves within the cemetery are of servicemen who died as prisoners of war in Japanese hands and had been cremated; after the war, their ashes were brought to Sydney and buried here. Here is also buried a civilian employee of the Admiralty and there is one French war grave.

Within the entrance building is the New South Wales Cremation Memorial, which commemorates 199 service personnel of World War II who were cremated within the state of New South Wales and whose ashes were subsequently scattered or buried at places where commemoration by a CWGC memorial was not possible.

Within the cemetery stands the Sydney Memorial to almost 750 personnel of the Australian Army, Royal Australian Air Force and Australian Merchant Navy who died in World War II in the eastern and southern regions of Australia and waters south of 20 degrees Latitude who have no known grave.

Chapels

Monuments and memorials

Graves and mausoleums

Buildings

References

External links

 Rookwood Catholic Cemetery
 (Crematorium)
 Rookwood Cemetery
 Rookwood Independent Cemetery
 Friends of Rookwood Inc.
 

Sydney localities
 
Buildings and structures in Sydney
Anglican cemeteries in Australia
Eastern Orthodox cemeteries
Roman Catholic cemeteries in Australia
Lutheran cemeteries
Jewish cemeteries in Australia
Protestant Reformed cemeteries
Cemeteries in Sydney
James Barnet buildings in Sydney
1868 establishments in Australia
Lidcombe, New South Wales
New South Wales State Heritage Register